The Secret Call is a 1931 American drama film directed by Stuart Walker and written by Arthur Kober, Eve Unsell and William C. deMille. The film stars Richard Arlen, Peggy Shannon, William B. Davidson, Charles Trowbridge, Jane Keithley, Selmer Jackson, and Ned Sparks. The film was released on July 25, 1931, by Paramount Pictures.

Cast 
Richard Arlen as Tom Blake
Peggy Shannon as Wanda Kelly
William B. Davidson as Jim Blake
Charles Trowbridge as Phil Roberts
Jane Keithley as Grace Roberts 
Selmer Jackson as Matt Stanton
Ned Sparks as Bert Benedict
Jed Prouty as Jim Neligan
Charles D. Brown as Bob Barnes
Harry Beresford as Frank Kelly
Larry Steers as Fillmore
Elaine Baker as Vera Lorraine
Frances Moffett as Gwen Allen
Claire Dodd as Maisie	
Patricia Farr as Ellen

References

External links
 

1931 films
American drama films
1931 drama films
Paramount Pictures films
Films directed by Stuart Walker
American black-and-white films
1930s English-language films
1930s American films